Tugayevo (Tuğay) is a rural locality (a selo) in Sabayevsky Selsoviet, Buzdyaksky District, Bashkortostan, Russia. The population was 300 as of 2010. There are 3 streets.

Geography 
Tugayevo is located 42 km north of Buzdyak (the district's administrative centre) by road. Idyashbash is the nearest rural locality.

References 

Rural localities in Buzdyaksky District